The 2019 Liga 3 Bangka Belitung is a qualifying round for the national round of 2019 Liga 3. PS Basel, the winner of the 2018 Liga 3 Bangka Belitung are the defending champions. The competition begin on September 9, 2019.

Standings

Champions

References

 

Bangka Belitung Islands
Liga Nusantara
3